Frances Brown may refer to:

Frances Brown, married name of Frances Drake (1912–2000), American actress
Frances Brown (murder victim) (died 1945), victim of serial killer William Heirens
Frances Brown (1943–1964), victim of the 1960s serial killer known as 'Jack the Stripper'

See also
Frances Browne (1816–1887), Irish poet and novelist
Frances Cave-Browne-Cave (1876–1965), English mathematician and educator
Francis Brown (disambiguation)